Pedro Eugênio de Castro Toledo Cabral (29 March 1949 – 20 April 2015) was a Brazilian politician who was an MP from 1998 to 2014.

References

1949 births
2015 deaths
Members of the Chamber of Deputies (Brazil) from Pernambuco